Blue Rain may refer to:

"Blue Rain", the musical, written by Choo, Junghwa, music by Huh, Soohyun, and produced by Choi, Soomyoung & C101 in South Korea.
Blue Rain, album by Japanese group The Checkers (Japanese band)
Blue Rain, album by Korean group Fin.K.L
"Blue Rain", song by Glenn Miller and His Orchestra with singer Ray Eberle, Mercer, Van Heusen, 1939
"Blue Rain", song by The Islanders (American band),	Frank Metis, Randy Starr 1959